Tsuneyoshi is a masculine Japanese given name.

Possible writings
Tsuneyoshi can be written using different combinations of kanji characters. Here are some examples:

常義, "usual, justice"
常吉, "usual, good luck"
常善, "usual, virtuous"
常芳, "usual, virtuous/fragrant"
常良, "usual, good"
常能, "usual, capacity"
恒義, "always, justice"
恒吉, "always, good luck"
恒善, "always, virtuous"
恒芳, "always, virtuous/fragrant"
恒良, "always, good"
恒能, "always, capacity"
庸義, "common, justice"
庸好, "common, good/like something"
庸慶, "common, congratulate"
庸嘉, "common, excellent"
毎義, "every, justice"
毎好, "every, good/like something"
毎喜, "every, rejoice"

The name can also be written in hiragana つねよし or katakana ツネヨシ.

Notable people with the name
Tsuneyoshi Murata (村田 経芳, 1838-1921), Japanese samurai, swordsman, marksman, firearm inventor, gunsmith, soldier, and military officer.
, Japanese composer.
, Japanese prince and equestrian.
, Japanese engineer and amateur radio operator.

See also
17563 Tsuneyoshi, a main-belt asteroid

Japanese masculine given names